The Burrumbeet Cup is a Time Honoredthoroughbred horse race, held under handicap conditions over a distance of 1800 metres at the Burrumbeet racecourse, Burrumbeet, Victoria, Australia on New Year's Day every year. It is a prestigious race, escpecially sought after by Ballarat Horse Trainers.
The 2023 edition was the 133rd running of this famous race and was won by local young Trainer Patrick Kearney, with his Stable Star "ASHY BOY". Ashy Boy's part owners have been with Pat since his start as a trainer with a his first ever horse named "Winning Red".

The 2020 Petrogas Regional Burrumbeet Cup was held on 1 January 2020 and was the 130th running of the race.

Prize money for the 2020 Burrumbeet Cup was $25,000 and Petrogas Regional is race sponsor. Petrogas Regional became the Burrumbeet Cup sponsor from 2015 onwards after the decision by Scott Petroleum to end their Burrumbeet Cup sponsorship following the running of the 2014 Burrumbeet Cup.

The Burrumbeet Park & Windermere Racing Club (BP&WRC) administer racing at Burrumbeet under the jurisdiction of Racing Victoria and all 14 committee members are volunteers. President of the BP & WRC is Rod McKinnon and club secretary is Paul Brumby.

2015 Burrumbeet Cup Day races
 
Race 1 - Eureka Concrete Maiden Plate (1800m)
Race 2 - T.B. White & Sons Maiden Plate (1350)
Race 3 - Mount Misery Sand & Soil Maiden Plate (1000m)
Race 4 - McKinnon Seed Cleaning 0-58 Handicap (1800m)
Race 5 - Edge Financial Partners BM64 Handicap (1350m)
Race 6 - www.horseracingshares.com.au 0-58 Handicap (1000m)
Race 7 - Petrogas Regional Burrumbeet Cup (1800m)

2015 Burrumbeet Cup

The 2015 Burrumbeet Cup winner was Asset Hound, trained by Glen & Barry James at Ballarat. Asset Hound defeated Pennon and Saintly Manner on 1 January 2015 at Burrumbeet racecourse in Burrumbeet, Western Victoria. Brandon Stockdale rode Asset Hound to victory in a time of 1:50:81 for the 1800 metres distance.

The 2015 Burrumbeet Cup was the 125th running of the Burrumbeet Park & Windermere Jockey Club's feature race.

A huge crowd of around 5,000 people attended the popular New Year's Day meeting and a total of $1000 was raised on the day for the National Jockeys Trust by club sponsor Horseracingshares.com.au along with Ballarat Courier sports journalist Tim O'Connor.

2014 Burrumbeet Cup

The 2014 Burrumbeet Cup winner was the Darren Weir trained Heisman, who defeated Tube (2nd) and Quick Shakes (3rd) on Wednesday 1 January 2014. 
Jockey Harry Coffey rode Heisman to an 8 length victory, recording a time of 1:49.43 for the 1800 metres.

Heisman was part owned by many of the Burrumbeet Park & Windermere Racing Club committee members, and directly after the Cup presentations, sixteen owners of Heisman all donated $50 each to raise $800 for Cystic fibrosis.

The Cup winning rider Harry Coffey - who has cystic fibrosis - rode three of the seven winners on 2014 Burrumbeet Cup day.

2013 Burrumbeet Cup

The Ken Moore trained Gottino won the 2013 Burrumbeet Cup from Easton (2nd) and Zlatan (3rd) in a time of 1:50:73. Wayne Davis rode Gottino to victory and the race was sponsored by Scott Petroleum.

The previous year's winner Tube, was unable to make it back to back victories, finishing in 4th place.

Burrumbeet Cup recent winners

References

External links
Petrogas Regional
Horse Racing Shares
Horse races in Australia